Karyakin/Kariakin (feminine: Karyakina/Kariakina) is a Russian-language surname. It may refer to:

Aleksey Karyakin, a former leader of the unrecognized separatist Luhansk People's Republic, part of Ukraine 
Nadezhda Karyakina, Soviet athlete
Sergey Karyakin, several persons
Sergey Karjakin, Ukrainian-born Russian chess grandmaster
Sergey Karyakin (pentathlete), Russian pentathlete, world champion (2010)
Sergey Karyakin (racing driver), Russian rally/racing quadricyclist, 2017 Dakar Rally champion
 (1930–2011), Russian writer, literary critic, and political activist

See also
Koryakin

Russian-language surnames